The Official List (or UKLA Official List) is the list maintained by the Financial Conduct Authority (acting in its capacity as the UK Listing Authority) in accordance with Section 74(1) of the Financial Services and Markets Act 2000 (the Act) for the purposes of Part VI of the Act.

The Official List is a list of securities issued by companies for the purpose of those securities being traded on a UK regulated market for the instruments listed in Section B of the Annex to the Investment Services Directive.  An example of a UK regulated market is the London Stock Exchange's Main Market.

References

External links
 The Official List

Securities (finance)